St. Berchmans College, Changanassery (Autonomous), also known as SB College, is one of the first Autonomous Colleges in Kerala. One of the most famous colleges in India, the college has a strength of 3000 students with 800 hostlers. The college celebrated its centenary (100th year) in the academic year of 2022.

Saint John Berchmans is the patron saint of the college and is venerated in the Church as the Patron of Students. It is a Syrian Catholic college. It is situated in the town of Changanassery 18 kilometers south of Kottayam. Established in 1922, the college celebrated its centenary in 2022. It has nineteen postgraduate and eight research departments and it offers 17 UG, 19 PG, 3 MPhil, and 9 doctoral programmes. Students and alumni of the college are referred to as  ‘Berchmanites’. It is run by the Catholic Archdiocese of Changanassery, is affiliated to the Mahatma Gandhi University in Kottayam and is recognized by the University Grants Commission (UGC). The college was granted autonomy by the UGC on 13 June 2014. The college was ranked 62 in all india ranking by NIRF in 2022, & ranked 79 in all India ranking by NIRF (National Institutional Ranking Framework) in 2021.

Academics and extra-curricular activities 

Research areas in science include Material science, Nanotechnology, Polymer Chemistry, Plant Taxonomy and Environmental Sciences. The college conducted an international conference on Science and Technology for Sustainable Development participated in by delegates from 26 countries in 2005. Apart from academics, the college has two units of National Service Scheme(NSS) in which 200 volunteers can be enrolled. NSS gives various avenues for its volunteers to engage in various campus and community activities.

The popular extra-curricular societies and clubs engage in activities concerned with debating, drama, film club, social service, photography, Jesus Youth, National Cadet Corps, Mock United Nations (MUN) etc.

It is the only college in India, apart from St. Stephen's College, New Delhi, to have a full-fledged Shakespearean Theatre. Shakespearean plays have been regularly staged since 1938.

Berchmans Institute of Management Studies (BIMS) 
Berchmans Institute of Management Studies (BIMS) established in 1995, is under the management of St. Berchmans College affiliated to Mahatma Gandhi University, Kottayam. It is a full-time Master of Business Administration programme. Berchmans Institute of Management Studies is recognized by All India Council for Technical Education, New Delhi.

Notable alumni 
 
 
 Kuzhikalail M. Abraham - Scientist, Professor and expert on lithium-ion batteries
 Mar George Alencherry - Major Arch Bishop of Syro Malabar Catholic Church

 Justice A. M. Babu, Former judge of Kerala High Court

 Kunchacko Boban - film actor
 C. V. Ananda Bose - IAS
 P. T. Chacko - former Home Minister of Kerala
 Bipin Chandran - scriptwriter 
 K.M. Chandy - former Governor(MP, Gujarat & pondicherry)
 Oommen Chandy - former Chief Minister of Kerala 
 Dr. B. Ekbal - Planning Board member, former Kerala University V.C
 V J James - Writer
 Cyriac Joseph - retired Supreme Court Justice 
 George Joseph - Scientist
 Jeethu Joseph - film director
 P. J. Joseph - former Education Minister, MLA
 Mathew Kavukattu - Servant of God Mar 
 Manoj Kuroor - writer
 Sibi Malayil - film director
 Tony Mathew -, orator, writer 
 N. Sreekantan Nair - former MP for Kollam Constituency
 Vishnunarayanan Namboothiri, poet, writer 
 Prem Nazir - film actor
 George Onakkoor
 P. K. Narayana Panicker - former NSS General Secretary
 P. Parameswaran (AKA Parameshwarji ) - Director of Bharatiya Vichara Kendra,Rashtriya Swayamsevak Sangh (RSS) ideologue,Padmavibhooshan Awardee
 Martin Prakkat  - film director
 M. V. Pylee - Indian Scholar, Padmabhushan Awardee
 A. A. Rahim - Indian Politician, Freedom Fighter and Union Minister
 Justice C. T. Ravikumar Judge Supreme Court of India
 John Sankaramangalam - filmmaker and former director of the FTII, Pune
 M. G. Soman - film actor
 Raju Narayana Swamy IAS - Addl. Secretary, Govt. of Kerala
 P. C. Thomas - former Central Minister
 Santosh Thundiyil - cinematographer

Gallery

References

Catholic universities and colleges in India
Arts and Science colleges in Kerala
Colleges affiliated to Mahatma Gandhi University, Kerala
Universities and colleges in Kottayam district
Educational institutions established in 1922
1922 establishments in India
Changanassery
Vazhappally
Academic institutions formerly affiliated with the University of Madras